Tamás Kertész (1 April 1929 – 2 March 1989) was a Hungarian football player who played for Ferencváros. He played 2 games for the Hungarian national team. After his playing career he was coach of the Ghana national football team. His granddaughter is the British tennis player Johanna Konta.

References

1929 births
1989 deaths
Hungarian footballers
Hungary international footballers
Olympic footballers of Hungary
Ferencvárosi TC footballers
Association footballers not categorized by position
Hungarian football managers
Debreceni VSC managers
Ghana national football team managers
Hungarian expatriate football managers
Expatriate football managers in Ghana
Hungarian expatriate sportspeople in Ghana